Çekmece is a town in the Turkish province of Hatay. It is within the metropolitan area of Antakya, and has an estimated population of around 25,501.

It is part of the municipality of Defne, an area that is named after the Greek mythological figure of Daphne. Tourist sites in Defne include the Harbiye Hydro Park and Harbiye Waterfall, as well as the historic site of St Simon's Monastery.

References

Populated places in Hatay Province